Neil Perry is an Australian chef.

Neil Perry may also refer to:

Sports
Neil Perry (cricketer) (born 1958), former English cricketer
Neil Perry (speedway rider) in 1988/89 South Australian Individual Speedway Championship

Music
Neil Perry (band), the screamo band
Neil Perry from The Band Perry

Fiction
Neil Perry (Dexter), fictional character in Dexter
Neil Perry (Dead Poets Society), fictional character in Dead Poets Society
Neil Perry (The Time Machine), fictional character in The Time Machine (1978 film)

Perry, Neil